
Sasabe is a small hamlet in the Altar Valley of southern Pima County, Arizona, United States, immediately north of the international border with Mexico.  It hosts a minor border crossing, an adobe sales outlet, a public school, a guest ranch, a general store with fuel pumps, a weekend bar, and a post office serving the ZIP Code of 85633. In 2010, the population of the 85633 ZCTA, including Sasabe, was 54.

History
The name Sasabe is derived from the Native American language of the Tohono O'odham (formerly Papago) meaning "head valley".
The post office was established at Sasabe in 1905.

Sasabe is best known for its historic Rancho de la Osa guest ranch, formerly the headquarters of a three million acre (12,000 km2) Spanish land grant. Some ranch buildings reportedly date to the late 17th century. The guest ranch opened in 1921. Guests have included Presidents Franklin Roosevelt and Lyndon Johnson.

On average, 165 cars, trucks, or pedestrians per day passed through the Sasabe Port of Entry in 2011. Sasabe, Arizona is smaller than its sister community, El Sásabe, Sonora, which is known for its burnt-adobe brickyards.

In the 2018–2019 school year, the local school served 28 children in grades K-8.

Geography
Sasabe is seated on an arid, gently rolling sand-plain relieved only by scatter shrub trees and grass hummocks. Much of the area north and east of Sasabe is within the Buenos Aires National Wildlife Refuge. In 2006,  of the refuge that border Mexico east of Sasabe were closed to public entry due to problems with smugglers and unauthorized border crossings.

Climate
Sasabe has a semi-arid climate (Köppen: BSh) with mild winters and very hot summers.

See also

 Baboquivari Peak
 Altar Valley
 2010 Saric shootout
 2015 Amado checkpoint protest

References

External links
 
 Sasabe at Google maps
 Buenos Aires National Wildlife Refuge
 LIFE Magazine article (Mar. 28, 1960) about town for sale

Unincorporated communities in Pima County, Arizona
History of Pima County, Arizona
Unincorporated communities in Arizona